Dingxiang is a county in the north central part of Shanxi province, China. It is under the administration of Xinzhou city.

Climate

See also
Daiyang village

References

External links
www.xzqh.org 

County-level divisions of Shanxi
Xinzhou